The 1984 Mediterranean Non-Aligned Countries Ministerial Meeting held in Valletta, Malta on 10 and 11 September 1984 was the first ever ministerial meeting of the Non-Aligned countries from the Mediterranean region. The idea of the organizer was to host an event with restricted number of participants from the Mediterranean basin where common concerns will be addressed. At the time, the group included Southern Mediterranean and Levantine Arab countries and only three European Non-Aligned countries of Malta, Cyprus and SFR Yugoslavia. The meeting concluded that freedom of the seas in a closed sea like Mediterranean should be exercised for peaceful purposes without military naval deployment, especially by non-Mediterranean countries. The event was envisaged as a preliminary collective effort by the countries concerned at the achievement of the peace in the region. The following meeting of the group was organized in 1987 on the Brijuni Islands in the Yugoslav constituent Socialist Republic of Croatia. The final document of the meeting was subsequently reaffirmed by the NAM movement as a whole when at the 1985 Luanda foreign ministers meeting the final document of that meeting called states of the world to respect the 1984 Valletta Declaration.

References

See also
 Foreign relations of Malta
 EU Med Group
 Cyprus–Malta relations
 Malta–Yugoslavia relations
 Libya–Malta relations

Mediterranean
Foreign relations of Malta
History of Valletta
1984 conferences
1984 in politics
1984 in Malta
Euromediterranean Partnership
Diplomatic conferences in Malta